Sky 5 is a television channel in New Zealand available on Sky.

The channel's shows are a variety of international shows, for example CSI: Crime Scene Investigation, The Simpsons, WWE, The Flash, Supergirl, Arrow, Tour of Duty, Hardcore Pawn and Pawn Stars.

History
The channel was started on 3 December 1994 as Orange on Sky UHF pre-set channel 7. Orange broadcast between 10am and around 11:30pm and during 1995 Juice TV began broadcasting overnight when Orange went off the air. On 1 January 1997, Cartoon Network began broadcasting between 6am and 4pm while Orange was not broadcasting.

Orange changed its name to Sky 1 on 1 June 1998 and introduced overnight programming, with The Simpsons debuting on 7 July 1998 with the first ever episode. The channel began broadcasting 24 hours a day on 1 January 1999 when the Sky Digital service was launched; however, the UHF channel continued to screen Cartoon Network between 6am-4pm and in 2000 this was replaced with Nickelodeon.

In 2005, Sky Network Television considered unencrypting Sky 1 to make it a free-to-air channel, but decided instead to purchase the existing network, Prime.

Sky 1 relaunched on 1 February 2008 and in the process its name was changed to The Box.

On 2 February 2018, 10 years after the channel relaunched as The Box, it rebranded for the third time in its history, as Sky 5.

Former logos

External links

Television channels in New Zealand
Television channels and stations established in 1994
S
1994 establishments in New Zealand